Macacha Güemes (1787-1866) was an Argentine heroine. A sister of Martín Miguel de Güemes, she, alongside her sister Francisca Güemes, is considered as a heroine of the Argentine War of Independence for her participation in the Gaucho War, during the war of independence.

References 
  Sosa de Newton, Lily (1980). Diccionario Biografico de Mujeres Argentinas. Buenos Aires: Plus Ultra. .

1787 births
1866 deaths
Argentine rebels
19th-century Argentine people
People of the Argentine War of Independence
Women in 19th-century warfare
19th-century rebels